The accuracy landing event at the 2005 World Games in Duisburg was played from 16 to 17 July. 16 parachuters, from 11 nations, participated in the tournament. The competition took place at Toeppersee Nordufer Duisburg.

Competition format
A total of six rounds were contested. Athlete with the lowest score is a winner.

Results

References

External links
 Results on IWGA website

Accuracy landing